The MTR Urban Lines Vision Train (also named MTR CRRC Qingdao Sifang EMU, also known as Q-Train) is a new rolling stock ordered by MTR Hong Kong in July 2015. They are expected to begin replacing all of the aging Metro-Cammell EMU (DC) trains starting at the end of 2022. The order currently consists of 744 cars (93 trainsets). This train gradually entered service in 27 November 2022.

Development 
In conjunction with the upgrade of the existing signalling system from SACEM to Advanced SelTrac CBTC, MTR Corporation originally planned for 78 8-car trainsets to be ordered. This arrangement was made as a replacement to the existing M-Trains, currently the oldest trains on the network, having been in operation since 1979. 15 M-Trains, excluding those operating on the Disneyland Resort line, were planned to be refurbished. However, this was later dropped as it would be more cost effective to purchase new rolling stock. So the rolling stock order was subsequently increased to 93 trainsets at HK$6.05 billion (US$779 million) on grounds that it provided "better value for money". The trains will operate on the Kwun Tong line, Tsuen Wan line, Island line and Tseung Kwan O line. All trainsets are expected to be fully delivered by 2023.

Progress of the trains entering service has been impeded because the aforementioned signalling system replacement program was severely delayed due to a crash on the Tsuen Wan line outside Central station in a test run during off-peak hours on the new signalling system in 2019. MTR blamed Thales for the incident by making three errors during the installation, which led to data not being properly established at crossover junction near Central station. These findings were corroborated by the Electrical and Mechanical Services Department.

While a small number of Q-trains have been delivered to Hong Kong since 2018, these trains, except for a few rare test runs, have been parked at the various depots of MTR's Urban Lines and the Siu Ho Wan depot. As the contractor for the SelTrac system, Alstom-Thales, failed to deliver a proper software fix for the system, MTR announced in March 2022 that all 93 trainsets would be retrofitted with SACEM so they can begin operations and replace the oldest M-trains servicing the Kwun Tong Line, so that they can be retired on time. The Q-trains will then continue to use SACEM until it is possible to use SelTrac.  On the 21st of August, the train began shadow test runs just after the last train to Whampoa departs.

On 22 November 2022, MTR announced that the first Q trains will commence operation on the Kwun Tong Line on the 27 November that year. On 27 November 2022 at 8:52, Q train set A753/A754 opened its doors to the public for the first time on the Kwun Tong Line, with the first train commencing operation at Choi Hung station.

Design
The new train sets feature an improved lighting system, new dynamic route maps, double-branched handrails, soft materials for hanging straps, colorful flooring and seats (leaning area, not the seats itself), wider doors and rubber gangways. The trains share a similar livery to the new MTR trains delivered since 2016, namely the S-Train, TML C-Train and R-Train which run on the South Island line, Tuen Ma line and East Rail line respectively.

All train doors and coupler systems are made by Faiveley Transport. The coupler systems are automatic and semi-permanent couplers.

References

MTR rolling stock
Electric multiple units of Hong Kong
CRRC multiple units
1500 V DC multiple units